Leonhard Kaufmann (born 12 January 1989) is an Austrian professional association football player who is currently playing for Austrian Erste Liga side SV Austria Salzburg.

Career
After one year with SK Austria Kärnten the talented offensive midfielder signed on 9 June 2010 for LASK Linz.

Notes

1989 births
Living people
Austrian footballers
Association football midfielders
SK Sturm Graz players
SK Austria Kärnten players
FC Energie Cottbus players
3. Liga players
People from Güssing
Footballers from Burgenland